David George Henry Ridley (16 December 1916 – 13 September 1998), known as Dave or Dai Ridley, was a Welsh professional footballer who played as a centre forward in the Football League for Brighton & Hove Albion.

Life and career
Ridley was born in Pontypridd, Wales, in 1916. He played local football before signing for Millwall in early 1945. He played for them in the 1945–46 FA Cup, and scored once, but moved on at the end of the season to Brighton & Hove Albion for a £400 fee. He suffered knee cartilage problems during his season at Brighton, and made only five appearances in the Third Division South. He then decided to give up full-time football, and signed for Southern League club Bedford Town, where he spent a 1947–48 season again disrupted by injury. Playing alongside his brother Frank, Ridley scored 12 goals from 22 appearances in all competitions, which included 5 of Bedford's 7 in the FA Cup against Eynesbury Rovers. He then returned to Wales where he played for Merthyr Tydfil, Ton Pentre and Pembroke Borough and worked in a power station. Ridley died in Pontypridd in 1998 at the age of 81.

References

1916 births
1998 deaths
Sportspeople from Pontypridd
Welsh footballers
Association football forwards
Bedford Town F.C. players
Millwall F.C. players
Brighton & Hove Albion F.C. players
Merthyr Tydfil F.C. players
Ton Pentre F.C. players
Pembroke Borough A.F.C. players
English Football League players
Southern Football League players